Richard Creath (born 1947) is an American philosopher and President's Professor of Life Sciences and of Philosophy at Arizona State University. He is a fellow of the American Association for the Advancement of Science.

References

21st-century American philosophers
Living people
1947 births
Philosophers of science
Philosophers of language
Arizona State University faculty
University of Pittsburgh alumni
Fellows of the National Endowment for the Humanities